Paduangoda is a village in Sri Lanka. It is located within Central Province.It is situated one kilometer from the historical Embekka Devalalaya

See also
List of towns in Central Province, Sri Lanka

External links

Populated places in Kandy District